Umbalapadi is a village in the Papanasam taluk of Thanjavur district, Tamil Nadu, India.

Demographics 

As per the 2001 census, Umbalapadi had a total population of 4530 with 2291 males and 2231 females. The sex ratio was 970. The literacy rate was 73.69.

References 

 

Villages in Thanjavur district